Parastizocera procera is a species of beetle in the family Cerambycidae, the only species in the genus Parastizocera.

References

Elaphidiini